Uramphisopus pearsoni is a species of isopod crustaceans in the family Phreatoicidae. It is only found in Brandum Bay basin in the north of Great Lake, Tasmania.

References

Isopod genera
Freshwater crustaceans of Australia
Vulnerable fauna of Australia
Endemic fauna of Tasmania
Invertebrates of Tasmania
Monotypic crustacean genera

Taxonomy articles created by Polbot